Beach Park is a Brazilian water park and resort, located at the beach of Porto das Dunas in Aquiraz, Fortaleza. Spread out across an area of 170,000 m2 (approximately 1.8 million ft²), its aquatic park consists of 35,000 m2 (376,700 ft²). In 2012, Beach Park had a total of 1,408,000 visitors throughout their facilities (water park, resorts and beach restaurant), 843,000 of those being within the Water Park.

The Beach Park complex is composed of the Beach, Aquatic Park and Resort.

Beach Park is affiliated with several national and international water parks, theme parks, tourism and entertainment associations. It is a member of the World Waterpark Association (WWA), the International Association of Amusement Parks and Attractions (IAAPA), the Brazilian Association of Restaurants and Entertainment Companies (ABRASEL), the Brazilian Association of the Hospitality Industry (ABIH) and the Aquiraz Convention & Visitors Bureau (ACVB).

Beach Park was one of the filming locations for the film O Noviço Rebelde (Brazilian adaptation of The Sound of Music).

Accommodations
 Beach Park Suites Resort offers 182 seaside apartments.
 Oceani Beach Park Resort, located alongside the beach of Porto das Dunas, has 131 rooms.
 Beach Park Acqua Resort offers tennis and multi-purpose sports courts, a fitness center, kid's club, restaurant, pool bar and infinity pool.
 Beach Park Wellness Resort has 90 rooms designed for families.

Extreme attractions

Constructed in 1989, the Insano previously held the Guinness world record for "World's Tallest Water Slide" at 135-feet tall. The slide held that record until the construction of the Kilimanjaro at Aldeia das Águas Park Resort (formerly Águas Quentes Country Club) in Barra do Piraí, Rio de Janeiro, at 193 feet tall.

Arrepius, the latest addition to the Beach Park complex, is a collection of ProSlide water slides that features the first and only Skybox in Brazil with five different descents that occupy an area of approximately 7,000 m2 (5347.37 ft²). The Skybox, a transparent capsule situated 25 meters above the park, which sends the occupants down it upon activation by button.

Travel awards 

2011
 "Best E-mail Campaign" - (WWA)
 " Best TV Commercial" - (WWA)

2012
 "Best Print Media"- (WWA)

2013
 "Best YouTube Campaign" - (WWA)
 "Best Radio Commercial"- (WWA)
 "Best Print Media"- (WWA)

Additional honors include:
 Quality WWA- (WWA)
Industry Leadership WWA- (WWA)
 Best Park in the Country- (O Estado Newspaper) 
 Best Theme Park- (Viagem e Turismo Magazine)

References

External links
 https://www.beachpark.com.br/home/en

Palace Entertainment
Resorts in Brazil
Water parks in Brazil
Buildings and structures in Ceará
Tourist attractions in Ceará